Marcelo Ramal (born c. 1959) is a provincial deputy in the Autonomous City of Buenos Aires in Argentina.

He was elected in October 2013 as a candidate of the Workers' Left Front.

He is a member of the Workers' Party (PO).

He is also an economist, and has worked at the National University in Buenos Aires.

External links 
article (Spanish)

1959 births
Living people
People from Buenos Aires
Argentine people of Spanish descent
Argentine people of Polish-Jewish descent
Argentine economists
Workers' Party (Argentina) politicians